The University of Santo Tomas Conservatory of Music, popularly known as "UST Music", is the music school of the University of Santo Tomas, the oldest and the largest Catholic university in Manila, Philippines.

Proclaimed as one of the only two universities to be a Center of Excellence in Music, the college has maintained its efforts and achievements to be a premiere music school. It is the only music school in the Philippines which has an all-student symphony orchestra and an all-student symphonic band. The Conservatory of Music has choral groups namely, Coro Tomasino, Liturgikon Vocal Ensemble, and the UST Singers. It also has instrumental groups; the UST Jazz Band, the UST Guitar Ensemble, Rondalla, Woodwind Quintet,  Brass Quintet, USTe Mundo- the ethnic ensemble and various smaller groups which can be called on as the need arises.

Every year, the conservatory takes most of the major prizes in competitions such as the National Music Competition for Young Artists (NAMCYA) and in other national music competitions.  The Conservatory of Music is very proud that in terms of population, it is the biggest music school in the country, and is able to graduate a considerable number of competent and talented musicians every year.

It has produced two national artists, Antonino Buenaventura and Ernani Cuenco.

The annual classical UST Christmas Concert is led by the conservatory students, faculty, and alumni.

Academics

Programs
 Undergraduate programs
 Bachelor of Music in Performance (majors in bassoon, cello, choral conducting, clarinet, contra bass, flute, French horn, guitar, oboe, orchestral conducting, percussion, piano, saxophone, trombone, trumpet, tuba, viola, violin, and voice)
 Bachelor of Music in Composition
 Bachelor of Music in Jazz
 Bachelor of Music in Musicology
 Bachelor of Music in Music Education
 Bachelor of Music in Music Theatre
 Bachelor of Music in Music Technology
 Graduate programs
 Master of Arts in Music
 Doctor of Philosophy in Music (major in music performance: choral conducting, guitar, piano, and voice)

References

External links
University of Santo Tomas - Official Website

Educational institutions established in 1945
Conservatory of Music
1945 establishments in the Philippines
Music schools in the Philippines